Abdalla Mohamed "Mo" Shariff (born 8 March 1993) is a professional footballer who most recently played for Bradford City as a forward.

Career
Shariff started his career in the youth setup at Slough Town, progressing to the first team in the summer of 2009. He played a full season in the Southern League, making 24 appearances in all competitions, scoring 5 goals. In August 2010, he joined Football League Championship side Queens Park Rangers on a free transfer with a one-year contract, after impressing on trial during the summer. In February 2011, he signed a two-year contract extension until the summer of 2013. In November 2011, he joined Southern Premier Division side St Albans City on loan. In December 2011, he joined Conference South side Staines Town on loan but failed to play any games due to injury. On 26 January 2012, he joined Conference South side Woking on a one-month loan deal. On 28 March 2013, he joined Football League Two side Dagenham & Redbridge on loan until the end of the season. On 29 March 2013, he made his professional debut in a 0–0 league draw with Barnet, replacing Toni Silva as a substitute. On 17 August 2013, Sharif featured on the bench for Queens Park Rangers in their 1–0 win over Ipswich Town

Career statistics

References

External links

1993 births
Living people
English footballers
Association football midfielders
Slough Town F.C. players
Queens Park Rangers F.C. players
St Albans City F.C. players
Staines Town F.C. players
Woking F.C. players
Dagenham & Redbridge F.C. players
Bradford City A.F.C. players
Hemel Hempstead Town F.C. players
Kings Langley F.C. players
English Football League players
National League (English football) players
Southern Football League players